The 52nd Rifle Corps was a corps of the Soviet Red Army. It was part of the 24th Army. It took part in the Eastern Front of World War II.

Organization 
 91st Rifle Division
 119th Rifle Division
 166th Rifle Division

Commanders 
 Franz Perkhorovich

Rifle corps of the Soviet Union